The 2019 Lucas Oil 200 driven by General Tire was the first stock car race of the 2019 ARCA Menards Series season and the 56th iteration of the event. The race was held on Saturday, February 9, 2019, in Daytona Beach, Florida at Daytona International Speedway, a 2.5 miles (4.0 km) permanent triangular-shaped superspeedway. The race was extended from its scheduled 80 laps to 86 due to a NASCAR overtime finish. At race's end, Harrison Burton of Venturini Motorsports would survive a one-lap overtime finish to win his third and to date, final career ARCA Menards Series win and his first and only win of the season. To fill out the podium, Todd Gilliland of DGR-Crosley and Grant Quinlan of Rette Jones Racing would finish second and third, respectively.

Background 

Daytona International Speedway is one of three superspeedways to hold NASCAR races, the other two being Indianapolis Motor Speedway and Talladega Superspeedway. The standard track at Daytona International Speedway is a four-turn superspeedway that is 2.5 miles (4.0 km) long. The track's turns are banked at 31 degrees, while the front stretch, the location of the finish line, is banked at 18 degrees.

Entry list

Practice

First practice 
The first practice was held on Thursday, February 7, at 4:00 PM EST, and would last for two hours.

Second and final practice 
The second and final practice session, sometimes known as Happy Hour, was held on Friday, February 8, at 9:30 AM EST, and would last for one hour.

Qualifying 
Qualifying was held on Friday, February 8, at 3:30 PM EST. Each driver was split into six groups, and each group would run four minute sessions.

Full qualifying results

Race results

References 

2019 ARCA Menards Series
NASCAR races at Daytona International Speedway
February 2019 sports events in the United States
2019 in sports in Florida